Maulana Azad National Urdu University is a Central University located in the city of Hyderabad in the Indian state of Telangana. It was named after Maulana Abul Kalam Azad, India's first Minister of Education, a freedom fighter in India's struggle for independence, and a scholar of Islam and Urdu literature. It was the only Urdu university in India until the second university was built in the city of Kurnool, Andhra Pradesh in 2015.

Campus
The university was established by an Act of the Parliament in January 1998, with an All India jurisdiction to promote and develop the Urdu language and to impart vocational and technical Education in Urdu medium through conventional and distance modes. The university has been awarded "A+" Grade by National Assessment & Accreditation Council (NAAC).

The university's headquarter at Gachibowli houses buildings for Administration, School of Languages, Linguistics and Indology, School of Education and Training, School of Arts and Social Sciences, School of Mass Communication and Journalism, School of Computer Science & Information Technology, Saiyid Hamid Library, Polytechnic, ITI, UGC-Human Resource Development Centre; Instructional Media Center; Directorate of Distance Education(DDE); Center for Women Studies; Center for Urdu Language; Literature and Culture; Center for Professional Development of Urdu Medium Teachers; Al-Beruni Centre for the study of Social Exclusion and Inclusive Policy; H.K Sherwani Center for Deccan studies and others.

The University has a satellite campus in Lucknow and a campus at Srinagar (Jammu and Kashmir). There are Colleges of Teacher Education in Bhopal, Darbhanga, Srinagar, Aurangabad, Sambhal, Asansol, Nuh, Bidar which are guided through School of Education and Training. The University runs four Polytechnic Colleges in Bengaluru, Darbhanga, Hyderabad and Cuttack; four ITIs in Bengaluru, Darbhanga, Hyderabad and Cuttack; and three Urdu Model Schools in Darbhanga, Hyderabad and Nuh (Meewat).

Organisation and administration

Governance
Shri Mumtaz Ali @ M or Madhukarnath has been appointed as the new Chancellor of the Maulana Azad National Urdu University, Hyderbad by the Visitor in his capacity as the Visitor of the University under statute 1(1) & 2 of the Statutes of the University framed under the MANUU Act effective from 17th December, 2021 for a period of three years. 

Past Chancellors of MANUU Hyderabad:
(1) Shri Inder Kumar Gujral, former Prime Minister of India  (24.05.1999 to 23.05.2002)
(2)  Prof. Obaid Siddiqui, an eminent scientist
(26.05.2005 to 25.05.2008)
(3) Dr. Syeda Saiyidain Hameed, former Member, Planning Commission of India (for two terms from 09.07.2008 to 08.07.2011 & 09.07.2011 to 08.07.2014)
(4) Shri Zafar Sareshwala, an Industrialist (01.01.2015 to 31.12.2017)
(5) Shri Firoz Bakht Ahmed, an educationist (17.05.2018 to 16.05.2021)
https://manuu.edu.in/Former-Chancellor

Schools and Departments
The Regular mode programs are imparted through 7 School of Studies https://manuu.edu.in/university/schools

 Languages, Linguistics & Indology
 Commerce & Business Management
 Mass Communication & Journalism
 Computer Science & Information Technology
 Arts & Social Sciences
 Education & Training
 Sciences

The Department s under the 7 Schools of studies are:

School of Languages, Linguistics & Indology
 Department of Arabic
 Department of English English
 Department of Hindi
 Department of Persian Persian
 Department of Urdu
 Department of Translation studies

School of Commerce & Business Management
 Department of Management and Commerce

School of Mass Communication & Journalism
 Department of Journalism & Mass Communication

School of Technology
 Department of Computer Science & Information Technology

School of Arts & Social Sciences
 Department of Islamic Studies
 Department of Economics
 Department of History
 Department of Political Science
 Department of Public Administration
 Department of Sociology
 Department of Social Work
 Department of  Women Education

School of Education & Training
 Department of Education & Training

School of Sciences
 Department of Mathematics
 http://manuu.ac.in/Eng-Php/index-english.php | title=:: Maulana Azad National Urdu University :: }}</ref>

The Departments are currently offering 84 programs and courses, (25 PhD; 21 PG; 10 UG, 05 PG Diploma and 05 Diploma programs and 2 Certificate courses.

Academics

Faculties
The university is home to the Maulna Azad Library, which was established in 1998. The library subscribes to 27 periodicals in Urdu, 129 in English, nine in Hindi and 40 popular magazines apart from 13 newspapers in Urdu, English, Telugu and Hindi.

The Centre for Urdu Language, Literature & Culture is associated with the university.

Memorial lecture
Vice-President Hamid Ansari delivered the first Mohammed Quli Qutub Shah memorial lecture at Maulana Azad Urdu University.

See also 
Education in India
Literacy in India
List of institutions of higher education in Telangana

References

Central universities in India
Universities in Hyderabad, India
Urdu in India
Language education in India
Memorials to Abul Kalam Azad
Universities in Telangana
Education in Hyderabad, India
Educational institutions established in 1998
1998 establishments in Andhra Pradesh